Mu Ko Chumphon National Park() is a national park of Thailand consisting of a group of islands in the Gulf of Thailand off the coast of, and part of, Chumphon Province, southern Thailand. Its old name was Had Sai Ree. It was renamed "Mu ko Chumphon" and established as a national park in 1999 by the forestry department. The area is 198,125 rai ~ . Mu Ko Chumphon National Park has many types of natural resources. Its forests, mostly tropical rainforest, are a type found only on the mountain and on large islands. They provide shelter and habitats for many living things. The number of visitors was 52,919 for the year 2019.

There are many beautiful islands such as Hat Thung Makham and Hat Sai Ri in Amphoe Mueang, Hat Arunothai in Amphoe Thung Tako, and Hat Tong Khrok in Amphoe Lang Suan. There are nearly 40 islands which have long beaches, white sand, and clear water. There are also many colorful coral reefs which are attractive for swimming, snorkeling and scuba diving. Two of the islands are swiftlets' habitats, the birds' nests being used in birds' nest soup.

See also
List of national parks of Thailand
List of Protected Areas Regional Offices of Thailand

References

National parks of Thailand
Islands of Thailand
Geography of Chumphon province